The Princess on a Pea is a 1977 Soviet fantasy film directed by Boris Rytsarev.

Plot 
Based on the tales of Hans Christian Andersen. When the time came for the prince to get married, an announcement appeared on the gate of the palace:  A princess is required.  But the prince did not wait for the visit and set off in search of himself. Going around a great many lands, the prince returned home, where he soon found the one he was dreaming of.

Cast 
 Irina Malysheva as the Princess on a Pea 
 Andrey Podoshian as Prince (as Andrey Podoshyan)
 Irina Yurevich First Princess
 Innokenty Smoktunovsky as King
 Alisa Freindlikh as Queen
 Marina Livanova Second Princess
 Yuri Chekulayev as First King
 Aleksandr Kalyagin as Second King
 Vasiliy Kupriyanov as Swineherd
 Igor Kvasha as Troll
 Svetlana Orlova as Third Princess
 Viktor Sergachyov as Herald
 Irina Murzaeva as marquise
 Yevgeny Steblov as poet
 Vladimir Zeldin as  Chief Hofmeister

Awards
 Special jury prize of the X All-Union Film Festival in Riga for creative efforts in the development of the fairy tale genre (Boris Rytsarev)

References

External links 
 

1977 films
1970s Russian-language films
Soviet fantasy films
Films based on works by Hans Christian Andersen
Gorky Film Studio films
1970s fantasy films
Works based on The Princess and the Pea
Films based on fairy tales